Vestnik Manʹchzhurii (Eng. Manchuria Monitor) was a monthly journal of the economy of Manchuria published from 1923 to 1930. The journal was published in Harbin in the Russian language with English summaries.

References

External links
Worldcat record
Catalog

Business magazines published in China
Defunct magazines published in China
Magazines established in 1923
Magazines disestablished in 1930
Mass media in Harbin
Monthly magazines published in China
Russian-language magazines